The 1977 St. Louis mayoral election was held on April 5, 1977 to elect the mayor of St. Louis, Missouri. It saw the election of James F. Conway. Incumbent mayor John Poelker decided not to seek a second term.

The election was preceded by party primaries on March 8.

Democratic primary

General election

References

Mayoral elections in St. Louis
St. Louis
1977 in Missouri